Fyens Stiftstidende A/S is a Danish media company, primarily centred on the newspaper Fyens Stiftstidende. It is owned 100% by Den Fynske Bladfond. It also publishes the periodical Xtra Fyens Stiftstidende and EjendomsAvisen FYN.

Associated or owned companies
The company owns Fyens Distribution A/S, which distributes the newspaper Fyens Stiftstidende, as well as:

 Område Avisen Nordfyn A/S (100%)
 Lokal-Avisen, Assens ApS (100%)
 Ugeavisen Odense K/S (50%)
 Radio 3 ApS (50%)
 Portal Fyn ApS (51%)
 Ugeavisen Svendborg K/S (10%)
 De Bergske Blade K/S (16%)

Newspaper companies of Denmark